Stizocera poeyi is a species of beetle in the family Cerambycidae. It was described by Félix Édouard Guérin-Méneville in 1838.

References

Stizocera
Beetles described in 1838